The 2015–16 LSU Lady Tigers basketball team will represent Louisiana State University during the 2015–16 NCAA Division I women's basketball season college basketball season. The Lady Tigers are led by fifth year head coach Nikki Fargas. They play their home games at Pete Maravich Assembly Center and are members of the Southeastern Conference. They finished the season 10–21, 3–13 in SEC play to finish in thirteenth place. They advanced to the second round of the SEC women's tournament where they lost to Kentucky.

Roster

Schedule and Results

|-
!colspan=12 style="background:#33297B; color:#FDD023;"| Exhibition

|-
!colspan=12 style="background:#33297B; color:#FDD023;"| Non-conference regular season

|-
!colspan=12 style="background:#33297B; color:#FDD023;"| SEC regular season

|-
!colspan=12 style="background:#33297B;"| 2016 SEC Tournament

Source:

Rankings
2015–16 NCAA Division I women's basketball rankings

References

See also
 2015–16 LSU Tigers basketball team

LSU Lady Tigers basketball seasons
LSU
LSU
LSU